The following lists events that happened during 2014 in Zambia.

Incumbents
President: Michael Sata (until 28 October), Guy Scott (starting 28 October)
Vice-President: Guy Scott (until 28 October), vacant thereafter
Chief Justice: Ernest Sakala

Events

October
 October 28 - Zambian media reports that President Michael Sata has died while receiving medical care in London.
 October 29 - Guy Scott, the Vice-President of Zambia, becomes the interim President following the death of Michael Sata in London on Tuesday.

References

 
2010s in Zambia
Zambia
Zambia
Years of the 21st century in Zambia